HMS Topaze was a 51-gun  wooden screw frigate of the Royal Navy.  She was launched on 12 May 1858, at Devonport Dockyard, Plymouth.

Her crew assisted in the building of the Race Rocks Lighthouse in British Columbia, Canada, and laid a bronze tablet in 1868 at the Juan Fernández Islands commemorating the stay of marooned sailor Alexander Selkirk. On the same voyage, the band from HMS Topaze played for the dedication of Congregation Emanu-El, now the oldest surviving synagogue building in Canada.

The voyage to Easter Island in 1868 saw the crew remove the two moai Hoa Hakananai'a and Moai Hava and ship them to Britain. Hoa Hakananai'a was found in November 1868 by officers and crew from the Topaze. When first seen, it was buried up to about half its height or even more. It was dug out, dragged down on a sledge, and rafted out to the ship.
Commodore Richard Ashmore Powell, captain of the Topaze, wrote to the British Admiralty offering the statues as a gift. Topaze arrived in Plymouth, England, on 16 August 1869. The Admiralty offered the moai to Queen Victoria, who proposed that they should be given to the British Museum.

The ship is notable for an incident when Agnes Weston came on board to plead the cause of Temperance; as she recalled in her memoir:

Topaze was sold on 14 February 1884 and broken up at Charlton.

Notes

References

 Paul Davis. William Loney RN - Victorian naval surgeon, Mid-Victorian RN vessel HMS Topaze Includes a list of the vessel's commanders. Retrieved: 2008.01.21.
 Robert Kraske. (2005). Marooned: The Strange But True Adventures of Alexander Selkirk. Clarion Books. .
 
 .

External links
 Image of the Voyage of HMS Topaz to the Pacific 1865-69.

Liffey-class frigates
Ships built in Plymouth, Devon
1858 ships